Liu Jiaxing (May 13, 1993) is a Chinese former figure skater. He competed at two World Junior Championships, reaching the free skate both times.

Programs

Competitive highlights
JGP: Junior Grand Prix

Detailed results

References

External links 
 
 
 
 
 
 
 
 

1993 births
Living people
Chinese male single skaters
Figure skaters from Harbin
Competitors at the 2015 Winter Universiade